Bolgar Buttress (‘Rid Bolgar’ \'rid 'bol-gar\) is the ice-covered buttress rising to 1688 m on the southeast side of Detroit Plateau on Nordenskjöld Coast in Graham Land, Antarctica, situated between the upper courses of Pyke and Albone Glaciers.  It has steep and partly ice free west, south and east slopes.

The feature is named after the medieval city of Bolgar, capital of Volga Bulgaria in 8-15th century AD.

Location

Map
 Antarctic Digital Database (ADD). Scale 1:250000 topographic map of Antarctica. Scientific Committee on Antarctic Research (SCAR). Since 1993, regularly upgraded and updated.

Notes

References
 Bolgar Buttress. SCAR Composite Antarctic Gazetteer.
 Bulgarian Antarctic Gazetteer. Antarctic Place-names Commission. (details in Bulgarian, basic data in English)

External links
 Bolgar Buttress. Copernix satellite image

Mountains of Graham Land
Bulgaria and the Antarctic
Nordenskjöld Coast